Interpreting is a translational activity in which one produces a first and final target-language output on the basis of a one-time exposure to an expression in a source language.

The most common two modes of interpreting are simultaneous interpreting, which is done at the time of the exposure to the source language, and consecutive interpreting, which is done at breaks to this exposure.

Interpreting is an ancient human activity which predates the invention of writing. However, the origins of the profession of interpreting date back to less than a century ago.

History

Historiography 

Research into the various aspects of the history of interpreting is quite new. For as long as most scholarly interest was given to professional conference interpreting, very little academic work was done on the practice of interpreting in history, and until the 1990s, only a few dozen publications were done on it.

Considering the amount of interpreting activities that is assumed to have occurred for thousands of years, historical records are limited. Moreover, interpreters and their work have usually not found their way into the history books. One of the reasons for that is the dominance of the written text over the spoken word (in the sense that those who have left written texts are more likely to be recorded by historians). Another problem is the tendency to view it as an ordinary support activity which does not require any special attention, and the social status of interpreters, who were sometimes treated unfairly by scribes, chroniclers and historians.

Our knowledge of the past of interpreting tends to come from letters, chronicles, biographies, diaries and memoirs, along with a variety of other documents and literary works, many of which (and with few exceptions) were only incidentally or marginally related to interpreting.

Etymology 
Many Indo-European languages have words for interpreting and interpreter. Expressions in Germanic, Scandinavian and Slavic languages denoting an interpreter can be traced back to Akkadian, around 1900 BCE. The Akkadian root / also gave rise to the term dragoman via an etymological sideline from Arabic.

The English word interpreter, however, is derived from Latin  (meaning 'expounder', 'person explaining what is obscure'), whose semantic roots are not clear.

Modes

Consecutive

In consecutive interpreting (CI), the interpreter starts to interpret after the speaker pauses; thus much more time (perhaps double) is needed. Customarily, such an interpreter will sit or stand near the speaker.

Consecutive interpretation can be conducted in a pattern of short or long segments according to the interpreter's preference. In short CI, the interpreter relies mostly on memory whereas, in long CI, most interpreters will rely on note-taking. The notes must be clear and legible in order to not waste time on reading them. Consecutive interpreting of whole thoughts, rather than in small pieces, is desirable so that the interpreter has the whole meaning before rendering it in the target language. This affords a truer, more accurate, and more accessible interpretation than where short CI or simultaneous interpretation is used.

An attempt at consensus about lengths of segments may be reached prior to commencement, depending upon complexity of the subject matter and purpose of the interpretation, though speakers generally face difficulty adjusting to unnatural speech patterns.

On occasion, document sight translation is required of the interpreter during consecutive interpretation work. Sight translation combines interpretation and translation; the interpreter must render the source-language document to the target-language as if it were written in the target language. Sight translation occurs usually, but not exclusively, in judicial and medical work.

Consecutive interpretation may be the chosen mode when bilingual listeners are present who wish to hear both the original and interpreted speech or where, as in a court setting, a record must be kept of both.

When no interpreter is available to interpret directly from source to target, an intermediate interpreter will be inserted in a relay mode, e.g. a Greek source language could be interpreted into English and then from English to another language. This is also commonly known as double-interpretation. Triple-interpretation may even be needed, particularly where rare languages or dialects are involved. Such interpretation can only be effectively conducted using consecutive interpretation.

Simultaneous 

Simultaneous interpretation (SI) has the disadvantage that if a person is performing the service the interpreter must do the best they can within the time permitted by the pace of source speech. However they also have the advantages of saving time and not disturbing the natural flow of the speaker.  SI can also be accomplished by software where the program can simultaneously listen to incoming speech and speak the associated interpretation. The most common form is extempore SI, where the interpreter does not know the message until they hear it.

Simultaneous interpretation using electronic equipment where the interpreter can hear the speaker's voice as well as the interpreter's own voice was introduced at the Nuremberg trials in 1945. The equipment facilitated large numbers of listeners, and interpretation was offered in French, Russian, German and English. The technology arose in the 1920s and 1930s when American businessman Edward Filene and British engineer Alan Gordon Finlay developed simultaneous interpretation equipment with IBM. Yvonne Kapp attended a conference with simultaneous interpretation in 1935 in the Soviet Union. As it proved successful, IBM was able to sell the equipment to the United Nations, where it is now widely used in the United Nations Interpretation Service.

In the ideal setting for oral language, the interpreter sits in a sound-proof booth and speaks into a microphone, while clearly seeing and hearing the source-language speaker via earphones. The simultaneous interpretation is rendered to the target-language listeners via their earphones.

The progressive shift from consecutive to simultaneous

Pavel Palazchenko's My Years with Gorbachev and Shevardnadze: The Memoir of a Soviet Interpreter gives a short history of modern interpretation and of the transition from its consecutive to simultaneous forms. He explains that during the nineteenth century interpreters were rarely needed during European diplomatic discussions; these were routinely conducted in French, and all government diplomats were required to be fluent in this language.  Most European government leaders and heads of state could also speak French. Historian Harold Nicolson attributes the growing need for interpretation after World War I to the fact that U.S. President Woodrow Wilson and British Prime Minister David Lloyd George "were no linguists". At the time, the concept and special equipment needed for simultaneous interpretation, later patented by Alan Gordon Finlay, had not been developed, so consecutive interpretation was used.

Consecutive interpreters, in order be accurate, used a specialized system of note-taking which included symbols abbreviations and acronyms.  Because they waited until the speaker was finished to provide interpretation, the interpreters then had the difficult task of creating from these notes as much as half an hour of free-flowing sentences closely matching the speaker's meaning. Palazchenko cites , Jean Herbert and the Kaminker brothers as skilled interpreters, and notes one unusual case in which André Kaminker interpreted a speech by a French diplomat who spoke for two and a half hours without stopping.

After World War II, simultaneous interpretation came into use at the Nuremberg trial, and began to be more accepted. Experienced consecutive interpreters asserted that the difficulties of listening and speaking at the same time, adjusting for differences in sentence structure between languages, and interpreting the beginning of a sentence before hearing its end, would produce an inferior result.  As well, these interpreters, who to that point had been prominent speakers, would now be speaking invisibly from booths.

In 1951, when the United Nations expanded its number of working languages to five (English, French, Russian, Chinese and Spanish), consecutive interpretation became impractical in most cases, and simultaneous interpretation became the most common process for the organization's large meetings. Consecutive interpretation, which provides a more fluent result without the need for specialized equipment, continued to be used for smaller discussions.

Whispered

Since time immemorial, whispered interpretation has been used, known in the trade by the French term chuchotage. To avoid disturbing the original speaker and those present listening to the original speaker, the interpreter's voice is kept at a low volume. To do this, the interpreter and the person requiring interpretation must sit or stand in close proximity to one another. No actual whispering is involved as this is difficult to decipher as well as being too much of a strain on the voice: the interpreter uses normal 'voiced' speech at a low volume. Only one or at the most two people in need of interpretation can be accommodated, unless portable electronic equipment is used.

This form of interpretation puts a strain on the interpreter who has to sit for long periods leaning towards the person in need of interpretation.

Types

Conference

Conference interpreting refers to interpretation at a conference or large meeting, either simultaneously or consecutively. The advent of multi-lingual meetings has reduced the amount of consecutive interpretation in the last 20 years.

Conference interpretation is divided between two markets: institutional and private. International institutions (EU, UN, EPO, et cetera), which hold multilingual meetings, often favor interpreting several foreign languages into the interpreters' mother tongues. Local private markets tend to have bilingual meetings (the local language plus another), and the interpreters work both into and out of their mother tongues. These markets are not mutually exclusive. The International Association of Conference Interpreters (AIIC) is the only worldwide association of conference interpreters. Founded in 1953, its membership includes more than 2,800 professional conference interpreters, in more than 90 countries.

Judicial

Judicial, legal, or court interpreting occurs in courts of justice, administrative tribunals, and wherever a legal proceeding is held (i.e., a police station for an interrogation, a conference room for a deposition, or the locale for taking a sworn statement). Legal interpreting can be the consecutive interpretation of witnesses' testimony, for example, or the simultaneous interpretation of entire proceedings, by electronic means, for one person, or all of the people attending. In a legal context, where ramifications of misinterpretation may be dire, accuracy is paramount. Teams of two or more interpreters, with one actively interpreting and the second monitoring for greater accuracy, may be deployed.

The right to a competent interpreter for anyone who does not understand the language of the court (especially for the accused in a criminal trial) is usually considered a fundamental rule of justice. Therefore, this right is often guaranteed in national constitutions, declarations of rights, fundamental laws establishing the justice system or by precedents set by the highest courts. However, it is not a constitutionally required procedure (in the United States) that a certified interpreter be present at police interrogation. This has been especially controversial in cases where illegal immigrants with no English skills are accused of crimes.

In the US, depending upon the regulations and standards adhered to per state and venue, court interpreters usually work alone when interpreting consecutively, or as a team, when interpreting simultaneously. In addition to practical mastery of the source and target languages, thorough knowledge of law and legal and court procedures is required of court interpreters. They are often required to have formal authorization from the state to work in the courts – and then are called certified court interpreters. In many jurisdictions, the interpretation is considered an essential part of the evidence. Incompetent interpretation, or simply failure to swear in the interpreter, can lead to a mistrial.

Escort interpreter

In escort interpreting, an interpreter accompanies a person or a delegation on a tour, on a visit, or to a business meeting or interview. An interpreter in this role is called an escort interpreter or an escorting interpreter. An escort interpreter's work session may run for days, weeks, or even months, depending on the period of the client's visit. This type of interpreting is often needed in business contexts, during presentations, investor meetings, and business negotiations. As such, an escort interpreter needs to be equipped with some business and financial knowledge in order to best understand and convey messages back and forth.

Public sector

Also known as community interpreting, is the type of interpreting occurring in fields such as legal, health, and federal and local government, social, housing, environmental health, education, and welfare services. In community interpreting, factors exist which determine and affect language and communication production, such as speech's emotional content, hostile or polarized social surroundings, its created stress, the power relationships among participants, and the interpreter's degree of responsibility – in many cases more than extreme; in some cases, even the life of the other person depends upon the interpreter's work.

Medical
Medical interpreting is a subset of public service interpreting, consisting of communication among healthcare personnel and the patient and their family or among Healthcare personnel speaking different languages, facilitated by an interpreter, usually formally educated and qualified to provide such interpretation services. In some situations, medical employees who are multilingual may participate part-time as members of internal language banks. Depending on country/state-specific requirements, the interpreter is often required to have some knowledge of medical terminology, common procedures, the patient interview and exam process. Medical interpreters are often cultural liaisons for people (regardless of language) who are unfamiliar with or uncomfortable in hospital, clinical, or medical settings.

For example, in China, there is no mandatory certificate for medical interpreters as of 2012. Most interpretation in hospitals in China is done by doctors, who are proficient in both Chinese and English (mostly) in his/her specialty. They interpret more in academic settings than for communications between doctors and patients. When a patient needs English language service in a Chinese hospital, more often than not the patient will be directed to a staff member in the hospital, who is recognized by his/her colleagues as proficient in English. The actual quality of such service for patients or medical interpretation for communications between doctors speaking different languages is unknown by the interpreting community as interpreters who lack Healthcare background rarely receive accreditation for medical interpretation in the medical community. Interpreters working in the Healthcare setting may be considered Allied Health Professionals.

In the United States, language access is a socioeconomic disparity, and language access to federally-funded health services is required by law. Title VI of the Civil Rights Act of 1964 prohibits discrimination on the basis of race, color, or national origin in any program or activity that receives Federal funds or other Federal financial assistance. Hospital systems and clinics that are funded by federal programs, such as Medicare, are required by this law to take reasonable steps towards ensuring equitable access to health services for limited English proficient patients.

Military interpreting

Interpreters are often used in a military context, carrying out interpretation usually either during active military combat or during noncombat operations. Interpretation is one the of the main factors in multi-national and multi-lingual cooperation and military cohesion of the military and civilian populations.

During inactive military operations, the most common goal of military interpreters is to increase overall cohesion in the military unit, and with the civilian population. One of the primary forces behind the feeling of an occupation is a lack of mutual intelligibility. During the War in Afghanistan, the use of American soldiers that did not speak the languages of Afghanistan, and the primary recruitment from northern Afghanistan, primarily Tajiks, led to a feeling of the United States and Tajik forces as an occupying force. This feeling was most common in majority Pashtun areas of the country, which in turn was one of the main causes of the Taliban's resurgence. If interpreters are not present inside war zones, it becomes extremely common for misunderstandings from the civilian population and a military force to spiral into an open conflict, or to produce animosity and distrust, forming the basis of a conflict or an insurgency.

Military interpreters are commonly found in Iraq and have been largely effective, particularly in the Kurdish held regions (Kurdistan Regional Government), during the fighting against ISIS. Military interpreters were the primary drivers in cooperation between the coalition and the Iraqi population and military. Likewise managing to produce stability in areas held by the coalition, Kurdish interpreters were known for being a primary aid in this endeavour.

The fundamental act of interpreting during active combat is an extremely stressful and dangerous. It is, however, necessary when different-language battalions are fighting together with no common intermediate language. Misunderstandings in this context are most often fatal, the most common misinterpretations are positioning and attempted break outs. In the chaos of combat, however, it can be very easy to make a mistake in interpreting, particularly with the immense noise and changing locations.

Military interpreters are also used within single armies instead of multi-lingual cooperation. In this context, a military interpreter is usually a given job in each unit. Common examples include Bosnia, Pakistan, Switzerland, and South Africa. This use of assigning soldiers with different languages to a single battalion helps reinforce a feeling of unity in the military force.

For an historical example, see also Linguistics and translations in the Austro-Hungarian Army.

Sign language 

A sign language interpreter must accurately convey messages between two different languages. An interpreter is there for both deaf and hearing individuals. The act of interpreting occurs when a hearing person speaks, and an interpreter renders the speaker's meaning into sign language, or other forms used by the deaf party(ies). The interpreting also happens in reverse: when a deaf person signs, an interpreter renders the meaning expressed in the signs into the oral language for the hearing party, which is sometimes referred to as voice interpreting or voicing. This may be performed either as simultaneous or consecutive interpreting. Skilled sign language interpreters will position themselves in a room or space that allows them to be seen by the deaf participants and heard clearly by hearing participants, as well as be in a position to hear and/or see the speaker or speakers clearly. In some circumstances, an interpreter may interpret from one language to another whether that is English to British Sign Language, English to American Sign Language, Spanish to English to American Sign Language and so on.

Deaf individuals also have the opportunity to work as interpreters. If they are certified they are referred to as a CDI (Certified Deaf Interpreter), if not they would be called a DI (Deaf Interpreter). The Deaf individual will team with a hearing counterpart to provide interpretation for deaf individuals who may not know the same sign language used in that country, who have minimal language skills, are developmentally delayed, have other mental and/or physical disabilities which make communication a unique challenge, or request one. In other cases the hearing interpreter may interpret in the sign language, whichever kind of sign language the team knows and the deaf team will then interpret into the language in which the individual can understand. They also interpret information from one medium of language into another – for example, when a person is signing visually, the deaf interpreter could be hired to copy those signs into a deaf-blind person's hand and add visual information.

Some interpreters have been formally trained in an Interpreter Training Program (ITP), though this is not always required. ITP lengths vary, and are usually two or four years to obtain a degree or certificate. Graduate programs are also available.

In the United States, Sign Language interpreters have National and some states have a State level certifications. The Registry of Interpreters for the Deaf (RID), a non-profit organization, is known for its national recognition and certification process. In addition to training requirements and stringent certification testing, RID members must abide by a Code of Professional Conduct, Grievance Process and Continuing Education Requirement. There are many interpreter-training programs in the U.S. The Collegiate Commission on Interpreter Education is the body that accredits Interpreter Preparation Programs. A list of accredited programs can be found on the CCIE web site.

European countries and countries elsewhere have their own national associations of Sign Language Interpreters. Some countries have more than one national association due to regional or language differences. The European Forum of Sign Language Interpreters (efsli) is the umbrella organization of sign language interpreters in Europe. In Canada, the professional association that recognizes and nationally certifies sign language interpreters is the Association of Visual Language Interpreters of Canada (AVLIC). Under AVLIC holds several affiliate chapters representing a specified region of Canada.

Sign language interpreters encounter a number of linguistic, environmental, interpersonal and intrapersonal factors that can have an effect on their ability to provide accurate interpretation. Studies have found that most interpreter training programs do not sufficiently prepare students for the highly variable day-to-day stresses that an interpreter must manage, and there is an ongoing conversation in the interpreting field as to how to appropriately prepare students for the challenges of the job. Proposed changes include having a more robust definition of what a qualified interpreter should know, as well as a post-graduate internship structure that would allow new interpreters to work with the benefit of supervision from more experienced interpreters, much like the programs in place in medicine, law enforcement, etc.

In Israel, Naama Weiss, a board member of Malach, the Organization of the Israeli Sign Language Interpreters, advertised a video which she produced. It was her paraphrase of the video So-Low, and showed her viewpoint upon the Israeli Sign Language interpreters' jobs. A study which was made in Finland found that, in comparison to the foreign language teachers and non-linguistic experts, a high cooperativeness was found to be more characteristic to simultaneous and consecutive interpreters, and Weiss showed it in her video, although she claimed to be comic.

One cost-effective method of providing sign-language interpretation services are computer-animated sign language avatars, such as SiMAX. The World Federation of the Deaf supports the use of avatars "for pre-recorded static customer information, for example, in hotels or train stations", and not to replace human interpreters.

Media

By its very nature, media interpreting has to be conducted in the simultaneous mode. It is provided particularly for live television coverages such as press conferences, live or taped interviews with political figures, musicians, artists, sportsmen or people from the business circle. In this type of interpreting, the interpreter has to sit in a sound-proof booth where ideally he/she can see the speakers on a monitor and the set. All equipment should be checked before recording begins. In particular, satellite connections have to be double-checked to ensure that the interpreter's voice is not sent back and the interpreter gets to hear only one channel at a time. In the case of interviews recorded outside the studio and some current affairs program, the interpreter interprets what they hear on a TV monitor. Background noise can be a serious problem. The interpreter working for the media has to sound as slick and confident as a television presenter.

Media interpreting has gained more visibility and presence especially after the Gulf War. Television channels have begun to hire staff simultaneous interpreters. The interpreter renders the press conferences, telephone beepers, interviews and similar live coverage for the viewers. It is more stressful than other types of interpreting as the interpreter has to deal with a wide range of technical problems coupled with the control room's hassle and wrangling during live coverage.

Modalities

Interpreting services can be delivered in multiple modalities. The most common modality through which interpreting services are provided is on-site interpreting.

On-site

Also called "in-person interpreting" or sometimes colloquialized as "face-to-face", this delivery method requires the interpreter to be physically present in order for the interpretation to take place. In on-site interpreting settings, all of the parties who wish to speak to one another are usually located in the same place. This is by far the most common modality used for most public and social service settings.

Telephone

Also referred to as "over-the-phone interpreting," "telephonic interpreting," and "tele-interpreting," telephone interpreting enables interpretation via telephone. Telephone interpreting can be used in community settings as well as conference settings. Telephone interpreting may be used in place of on-site interpreting when no on-site interpreter is readily available at the location where services are needed. However, it is more commonly used for situations in which all parties who wish to communicate are already speaking to one another via telephone (e.g. telephone applications for insurance or credit cards, or telephone inquiries from consumers to businesses).

Video

Interpretation services via Video Remote Interpreting (VRI) or a Video Relay Service (VRS) are useful for spoken language barriers where visual-cultural recognition is relevant, and even more applicable where one of the parties is deaf, hard-of-hearing or speech-impaired (mute). In such cases the direction of interpretation is normally within the same principal language, such as French Sign Language (FSL) to spoken French and Spanish Sign Language (SSL) to spoken Spanish. Multilingual sign language interpreters, who can also interpret as well across principal languages (such as to and from SSL, to and from spoken English), are also available, albeit less frequently. Such activities involve considerable effort on the part of the interpreter, since sign languages are distinct natural languages with their own construction and syntax, different from the aural version of the same principal language.

With video interpreting, sign language interpreters work remotely with live video and audio feeds, so that the interpreter can see the deaf or mute party, converse with the hearing party and vice versa. Much like telephone interpreting, video interpreting can be used for situations in which no on-site interpreters are available. However, video interpreting cannot be used for situations in which all parties are speaking via telephone alone. VRI and VRS interpretation requires all parties to have the necessary equipment. Some advanced equipment enables interpreters to control the video camera, in order to zoom in and out, and to point the camera toward the party that is signing.

Venues

The majority of professional full-time conference interpreters work for phone interpreting agencies, health care institutions, courts, school systems and international organizations like the United Nations, (for the United Nations Interpretation Service), the European Union, or the African Union.

The world's largest employer of interpreters is currently the European Commission, which employs hundreds of staff and freelance interpreters working into the official languages of the European Union and some others in DG Interpretation. In 2016, Florika Fink-Hooijer was appointed as Director General and the first ever Knowledge Centre on Interpretation was created. She had spoken about the need to "futureproof" services by strengthening the skills of colleagues to work with new technologies.' as well as how Artificial Intelligence may be an (un)desired revolution in linguistic services. Subsequently, she drove forward the digitalization of the service by introducing features like automatic speech recognition and other support services to interpreters. During the COVID-19 pandemic, she scaled up multilingual interpretation in hybrid meetings via new digital platforms and technologies, which was a "watershed moment" for the interpretation profession.

The European Union's other institutions (the European Parliament and the European Court of Justice) have smaller interpreting services.

The United Nations employs interpreters at almost all its sites throughout the world. Because it has only six official languages, however, it is a smaller employer than the European Union.

Interpreters may also work as freelance operators in their local, regional and national communities, or may take on contract work under an interpreting business or service. They would typically take on work as described above.

Militaries often use interpreters to better communicate with the local population. One notable example is the US military during the war in Iraq and Afghanistan.

Associations
There are a number of interpreting and translation associations around the world, including NAATI (National Accreditation Authority for Translators and Interpreters), AIIC (The International Association of Conference Interpreters), CATTI (China Accreditation Test for Translators and Interpreters), CTTIC (Canadian Translators, Terminologists and Interpreters Council), the Institute of Translation & Interpreting, ADICA (Argentinian International Association of Conference and Interpreters) and TAALS (The American Association of Language Specialists).

Certifications

No worldwide testing or certification agency exists for all types of interpreters. For conference interpretation, there is the International Association of Conference Interpreters, or AIIC.

Specific regions, countries, or even cities will have their own certification standards. In many cases, graduates of a certain caliber university program acts as a de facto certification for conference interpretation.

China

The most recognized interpretation & translation certificate in P.R.C. is China Accreditation Test for Translation and Interpretation, or CATTI.
It is entrusted by the Ministry of Human Resources and Social Security of P.R.C. It is a translation and interpretation professional qualification accreditation test which is implemented throughout the country according to uniform standards, in order to assess examinees' bilingual translation or interpretation capability.
CATTI was introduced in 2003. In later 2013, translation and interpreting tests of different levels in English, French, Japanese, Russian, German, Spanish and Arabic were held across the nation.

Those examinees who pass CATTI and obtain translation and interpretation certificates acquire corresponding translation and interpretation professional titles.
 Senior translator or interpreter – professor of translation or interpretation
 Level 1 translator or interpreter – associate professor of translation or interpretation
 Level 2 translator or interpreter – translator or interpreter
 Level 3 translator or interpreter – assistant translator or interpreter

Relevant institutions from Australia, France, Japan, the Republic of Korea, Singapore and other countries as well as Hong Kong Special Administrative Region and the region of Taiwan have established work ties with CATTI.

Germany

In Germany, anyone can become and call themselves an interpreter; access to this profession is not regulated, but court interpreters must be sworn in and prove their qualifications, e.g. through a recognized certificate or professional experience of several years.

In order to learn and practice the necessary skills, colleges and universities offer studies in Translation and/or Interpretation Studies, primarily to/from English, but there are also Sign Language Interpretation studies.
Admission to higher education, however, is highly restricted.

Some states offer a State Examination title .
Unlike a bachelor's or master's degree, this certificate merely certifies professional skills.
Access to the exam is far easier, but requires proof of the necessary skills.
For that, there are private schools that offer preparatory courses.
Attending these schools is usually sufficient to prove someone's aptitude.
Of course, a university or college degree is accepted, too.

Furthermore, the State Examination is offered in many more languages, including German Sign Language, yet primarily to/from German.

See also 

 Interpreting notes
 List of translators and interpreters associations

Notes

References

Sources
 Bertone, Laura: The Hidden Side of Babel: Unveiling Cognition, Intelligence and Sense. 2006, ISBN 987-21049-1-3 [Evolución, Organización intercultural]
 Farwick, Judith (2018). Between the Signs. How to take notes without words. Duesseldorf.

Further reading

External links 

 AIIC (International Association of Conference Interpreters) website
 Routledge Translation Studies Portal – Interpreting Studies books
 The archives of the International Journal of Translation and Interpreting Research
 Association of Language Companies (USA)

 
Articles containing video clips